Mackenzie Rio Davis (born April 1, 1987) is a Canadian actress, producer, and model. She made her feature film debut in Smashed (2012). In 2013, she appeared in Breathe In and The F Word (for which she was nominated for the Canadian Screen Award for Best Supporting Actress). She also starred in The Martian (2015), Blade Runner 2049 (2017), and Happiest Season (2020). 

From 2014 to 2017, Davis starred as computer programmer Cameron Howe in the AMC television series Halt and Catch Fire. She also co-starred in the television series Black Mirror episode "San Junipero", for which she received critical acclaim. In 2019, she starred as the augmented super-soldier Grace in Terminator: Dark Fate, opposite Arnold Schwarzenegger and Linda Hamilton. In 2021, she had a lead role in the miniseries Station Eleven, which earned her a Critics' Choice Super Award for Best Actress in a Science Fiction/Fantasy Series.

Early life
Davis was born in Vancouver, British Columbia to Lotte, a British graphic designer from South Africa, and John Davis, a hairdresser from Liverpool, England. Her parents own AG Hair. She graduated from Collingwood School in West Vancouver in 2005 and then attended McGill University in Montreal, Quebec. She went on to study acting at the Neighborhood Playhouse in New York City.

Career
Davis's first feature film was Smashed. In 2015, she appeared in The Martian as NASA satellite communications engineer Mindy Park. 

From 2014 to 2017, she played programming prodigy Cameron Howe in Halt and Catch Fire for the duration of its four-season run.

In 2016, she starred as Yorkie in "San Junipero", an episode of the anthology series Black Mirror. In June 2016, she was cast as Mariette in Blade Runner 2049.

In 2019, she headlined as one of the newest cast members to join in Terminator: Dark Fate, where she starred as an augmented super soldier who is sent from the future to protect Dani Ramos. In October 2019, she was cast in the lead role in the HBO Max miniseries Station Eleven.

In 2020, Davis starred as Kate in The Turning, opposite Finn Wolfhard and Brooklynn Prince. The film is a modern adaptation of the 1898 horror novella The Turn of the Screw by Henry James. She also starred as Diana Hastings in Irresistible, a film by Jon Stewart about the outsized influence of money on the American electoral system. She also starred in the 2020 rom-com Happiest Season co-starring Kristen Stewart.

In February to April 2023 she played the role of Isolde in Phaedra in an updated version by Simon Stone at the National Theatre in London.

Upcoming projects
In June 2020, it was announced that Davis would be part of the ensemble cast of Zellner Brothers' science-fiction comedy Alpha Gang, which includes Jon Hamm, Andrea Riseborough, Nicholas Hoult, Sofia Boutella and Steven Yeun. 

In May 2022, she signed to star in Justin Anderson’s directorial debut Swimming Home, an adaptation of the Booker Prize-nominated novel of the same name by Deborah Levy, alongside Christopher Abbott and Ariane Labed.

Filmography

Film

Television

Theatre

Accolades

References

Further reading

External links

1987 births
Living people
Canadian film actresses
Canadian television actresses
Canadian people of English descent
Canadian people of South African descent
Canadian expatriate actresses in the United States
Actresses from Vancouver
Actresses from British Columbia
21st-century Canadian actresses
McGill University alumni
Neighborhood Playhouse School of the Theatre alumni
Collingwood School alumni